Lemony Snicket's A Series of Unfortunate Events (also simply known as A Series of Unfortunate Events) is a 2004 American adventure black comedy film directed by Brad Silberling from a screenplay by Robert Gordon, based on the first three novels of the book series A Series of Unfortunate Events: The Bad Beginning (1999), The Reptile Room (1999), and The Wide Window (2000), by Lemony Snicket (the pen name of American author Daniel Handler). It stars Jim Carrey, Liam Aiken, Emily Browning, Timothy Spall, Catherine O'Hara, Billy Connolly, Cedric the Entertainer, Luis Guzmán, Jennifer Coolidge, and Meryl Streep, and Jude Law as the voice of Lemony Snicket.

Nickelodeon Movies purchased the film rights to Handler's book series in 2000 and soon began development of a film with Barry Sonnenfeld attached to direct. Handler adapted the screenplay and courted Carrey for Count Olaf. Sonnenfeld left over budget concerns in January 2003 and Brad Silberling took over. Robert Gordon rewrote Handler's script, and principal photography started in November 2003. The film was entirely shot using sound stages and backlots at Paramount Pictures and Downey Studios.

Lemony Snicket's A Series of Unfortunate Events was released theatrically in the U.S. on December 17, 2004, by Paramount Pictures with DreamWorks Pictures distributing the movie internationally. It received positive reviews from critics, with many praising its production values and performances (particularly Carrey's performance), while some criticized its comical tone and short length. The film grossed $211 million worldwide. At the 77th Academy Awards, it won the Academy Award for Best Makeup and received nominations for Best Art Direction, Best Costume Design, and Best Original Score.

Plot
In a clock tower, investigator Lemony Snicket begins writing a documentation of the whereabouts of the Baudelaire children: 14-year-old inventor Violet, her 12-year-old bibliophile brother Klaus, and their mordacious baby sister Sunny. One day, the children are orphaned when a mysterious fire destroys their mansion, killing their parents. Mr. Poe, the family banker, manages their affairs and leaves them in the care of Count Olaf, a nefarious stage actor intent upon obtaining their family fortune, which will remain in the custody of the bank until Violet turns eighteen. He forces them to do heavy chores and belittles them.

Driving back from the court where Olaf has legally obtained custody of the children, he stops to go into a general store, leaving them locked in the car parked on train tracks with a train heading toward them. They divert the train by building a device to remotely activate the railroad switch. Mr. Poe arrives and takes them away, thinking that Olaf was allowing Sunny to drive.

The orphans are taken to their uncle, Dr. Montgomery Montgomery, an eccentric but kind herpetologist, but Olaf arrives disguised as his assistant "Stephano". The orphans attempt to warn Monty, but he believes he is after the Incredibly Deadly Viper, a giant misnomer python, in his laboratory. Monty is discovered dead shortly after, his death blamed on the viper. They are almost placed in Stephano's care by Mr. Poe, but Sunny proves his guilt by showing the snake is harmless and he escapes.

Mr. Poe leaves them with their Aunt Josephine, a grammar-obsessed widow with panphobia. Olaf appears, disguised as a sea captain named "Captain Sham", to meddle with their plans again. One day, Josephine is not at the house, leaving an apparent suicide note entrusting them to Captain Sham. Klaus deduces that Olaf forced her to forge the note, but she left a hidden message revealing her location. They sail to the cave where she is hiding and rescue her, but attract leeches. Olaf appears and takes the children, leaving Josephine to be eaten by the leeches. Mr. Poe finds him with the children, and Olaf pretends to have rescued them. Mr. Poe is fooled and gives the children back to him.

Olaf plans a play titled "The Marvelous Marriage", starring Violet and him as a bride and groom. Klaus's suspicions reveal that he is planning to take advantage of the play to really marry Violet in an attempt to get the fortune, using legally recognized vows and a bona fide justice of the peace. He locks Sunny up in a birdcage, threatening to drop her to her death if Violet refuses to take part in the play.

Klaus escapes and finds a hidden tower in Olaf's house, where he discovers a large window with a set of lenses that, if positioned correctly, can focus the rays of the sun. He realizes that Olaf used it to set fire to the Baudelaire mansion. Using the window, Klaus manages to burn the marriage certificate, leading to Olaf's arrest, but he escapes later on.

Violet, Klaus, and Sunny are taken to visit the charred remains of their old home one last time. A lost letter from their parents finally arrives, and inside is a spyglass announcing their family's secret society. Snicket finishes writing his documentation and hides the papers in the clock tower for his publisher to find. He concludes that despite the siblings' recent unfortunate events, they have each other. Mr. Poe drives the Baudelaires to their next home.

Cast

 Jim Carrey as Count Olaf, a villainous stage actor and master of disguise who lusts after the Baudelaire family fortune.
 Dr. Stephano, Count Olaf's first disguise who pretends to be Dr. Montgomery's new assistant, he later kills Montgomery and tries to frame The Incredibly Deadly Viper but fails.
 Captain Julio Sham, a peg leg sea captain and Count Olaf's second disguise. He makes Josephine give the Baudelaires to him and later kills Josephine by making her fall into the lake with leeches
 Emily Browning as Violet Baudelaire, a brilliant inventor. She is the eldest of the Baudelaire siblings and makes inventions out of everyday items.
 Liam Aiken as Klaus Baudelaire, an intelligent and kind-hearted bibliophile. He is the middle child of the Baudelaire siblings and uses his encyclopaedic knowledge to get them out of trouble.
 Kara and Shelby Hoffman as Sunny Baudelaire, the youngest Baudelaire sibling. She is an infant with four very sharp teeth. Her dialogue is mostly subtitled as she communicates via unintelligible babbling.
 Jude Law as the voice of Lemony Snicket, an introverted writer and the narrator of the story. Background actor James Henderson plays Snicket physically.
 Timothy Spall as Arthur Poe, a banker who informs the Baudelaire children of the fire and manages their affairs in its aftermath.
 Billy Connolly as Dr. Montgomery Montgomery, an eccentric but kindly herpetologist and the Baudelaires' uncle and temporary guardian.
 Meryl Streep as Josephine Anwhistle, a paranoid, OCD-stricken grammar stickler and the Baudelaires' aunt and temporary guardian.
 Jamie Harris as the Hook-Handed Man, Count Olaf's main minion.
 Catherine O'Hara as Justice Strauss, Count Olaf's kind neighbor and a judge.
 Cedric the Entertainer as the Constable, a skeptical detective.
 Luis Guzmán as the Bald-Headed Man, one of Count Olaf's minions.
 Craig Ferguson as the Person of Indeterminate Gender, one of Count Olaf's minions.
 Jennifer Coolidge and Jane Adams as the White-Faced Women, two of Count Olaf's minions.
 Fred Gallo as Judge Gallo, a judge who grants custody of the Baudelaires to Count Olaf.
 Deborah Theaker as Mrs. Poe, Mr. Poe's wife
 Rick Heinrichs and Amy Brenneman (both unbilled) as Bertrand and Beatrice Baudelaire, Klaus, Violet and Sunny's deceased parents.
 Dustin Hoffman (uncredited) as a Critic who attends Count Olaf's The Marvelous Marriage.
 Jane Lynch (uncredited) as realtor
 Gilbert Gottfried (uncredited) as the voice of the Aflac Duck, who appeared in a cameo.

Daniel Handler, the writer of the Lemony Snicket stories, appears as a photographer.

Notes 
Handler initially viewed Count Olaf as a James Mason type. Carrey was not familiar with the book series when he was cast, but he became a fan of the series. "Handler's books are just a bold and original way to tell a children's story," he said. Carrey was also attracted to the role despite self-parody concerns. Silberling was open to Carrey's idea of improvisation for various scenes, especially the Stephano and Captain Sham alter egos. To make his prosthetic makeup more comfortable and easier to apply, Carrey shaved his head bald for the part. His inspiration for Olaf's voice was combining the voices of Orson Welles and Bela Lugosi.

Emily Browning was cast as Violet Baudelaire when she auditioned at a casting call in Australia. She was sent Handler's original script when Barry Sonnenfeld was planning to direct, and screen tested for the part using an English accent. Browning became a fan of the books after reading Handler's original script. The actress was not cast until Silberling took over, then her character's accent was changed to American.

Production

Development
Nickelodeon Movies purchased the film rights to the A Series of Unfortunate Events novel series in May 2000. Paramount Pictures, owner of Nickelodeon Movies, agreed to co-finance, along with Scott Rudin. Various directors, including Terry Gilliam and Roman Polanski, were interested in making the film. One of Handler's favorite candidates was Guy Maddin. In June 2002, it was announced that Barry Sonnenfeld was hired to direct. He was chosen because he previously collaborated with Rudin and because of his black comedy directing style from The Addams Family, Addams Family Values and Get Shorty. Sonnenfeld referred to the Lemony Snicket novels as his favorite children's stories. The director hired Handler to write the script with the intention of making Lemony Snicket a musical, and cast Carrey as Count Olaf in September 2002.

The film suffered setbacks in development in December 2002. Rudin left Unfortunate Events over budget concerns. While Sonnenfeld and Carrey remained, Sonnenfeld admitted he was skeptical of Paramount's $100 million budget. The studio decided that changing the shoot from Hollywood to Wilmington, North Carolina, would be less expensive. The April 2003 start date was also pushed back. Paramount eventually settled the situation in January 2003 by enlisting help from DreamWorks Pictures to co-finance the film, but Sonnenfeld vacated the director's position. Rudin and Sonnenfeld had no involvement with the film afterward, but were credited as executive producers. Carrey remained with approval over the hiring of the next director.

Brad Silberling signed on to direct in February 2003. He was not familiar with the series when he was first approached. He quickly read the first three novels and was excited that "Hollywood was taking a chance to put over $100 million to adapt these inventive children's books onto screen". Handler, who wrote eight drafts of the script for Sonnenfeld, was replaced by Robert Gordon in May 2003. Handler approved of the changes that were made to his screenplay. "I was offered credit on the film for screenwriting by the Writers Guild of America", Handler continued, "but I didn't take it because I didn't write it. I felt like it would be an insult to the guy who did."

Filming
Filming was set to begin in October 2003, but was pushed back. Principal photography for Lemony Snicket's A Series of Unfortunate Events began on November 10, 2003, using the sound stages and backlot at Paramount Studios in Hollywood. Silberling avoided using too many digital or chroma key effects because he wanted the younger actors to feel as if they were working in a realistic environment. Olaf's mansion occupied two sound stages, while the graveyard and the ruins of the Baudelaire mansion were constructed on the Paramount back lot. After 21 weeks of shooting at Paramount, production then moved to Downey Studios, a former NASA facility in Downey, California, for eight more weeks. Downey housed the circular railroad crossing set complete with forced perspective scenery, as well as a newly constructed water tank complete with over one million gallons of water. The water tank was instrumental in filming scenes set at Briny Beach, Lake Lachrymose, Damocles Dock and Curdled Cave. Filming for A Series of Unfortunate Events ended on May 29, 2004.

Design

Silberling, production designer Rick Heinrichs and costume designer Colleen Atwood all aimed for the film's setting to be ambiguous, giving it a "timeless" feel. Heinrichs also added steampunk designs to the period. To contribute to the setting, Silberling hired Emmanuel Lubezki as the cinematographer because he was impressed with the trio's work on Sleepy Hollow.

Lubezki compared the cinematic similarities to Sleepy Hollow, notably the monochromatic look of both films. He also chose a specific color palette backdrop for A Series of Unfortunate Events. "The story is very episodic, so we picked a different color scheme for each section. For example, Count Olaf's house has a lot of greens, blacks and grays; the house of Uncle Monty has a lot of greens and browns and a bit of yellow; and the house of Aunt Josephine has blues and blacks." The railroad crossing set was constructed on a cyclorama, which was the most ambitious set piece for the art department on using elements of "in house" special effects and matte paintings.

Visual effects
Industrial Light & Magic (ILM), supervised by Stefen Fangmeier, created the film's 505 visual effects shots. The filmmakers used as few digital effects as possible, though the train and smoke for the railroad crossing scene were created entirely by computer animation. ILM also used color grading techniques for the Lake Lachrymose scene, which required complete animation for the leeches. The digital animators studied footage of the 2003 Atlantic hurricane season to accurately depict Hurricane Herman, which was ILM's most ambitious use of computer-generated imagery (CGI) for the film. Nexus Productions designed the opening "Littlest Elf" animated sequence by modeling it after stop-motion animation and completing it with computer animation. The snakes at Monty's house were a combination of real snakes and animatronics. The animatronics, primarily the Incredibly Deadly Viper, were used as reference models that ILM later enhanced using CGI. Because working with infants was sometimes risky in producing a film, four scenes involving Sunny Baudelaire required CGI with motion capture technology. Among these are the shot of Sunny hanging on to a table by her teeth, catching a spindle with her mouth and the scene where she is entangled with the Incredibly Deadly Viper. Animation supervisor Colin Brady used his baby daughter for motion capture recording. Kevin Yagher designed a remote-controlled animatronic of Sunny.

Release

Marketing

In October 2002, Nickelodeon Movies hired Activision (which actually had a partnership with DreamWorks) to create the film's tie-in video game. The agreement also included options for sequels. Silberling delivered his first cut of the film to the studio in August 2004. Fearing his original version was "too dark", Paramount and DreamWorks conducted test screenings. The film was then reedited over family-friendliness concerns. Given its December release, the film's marketing campaign was criticized as a deliberately anti-holiday comedy with taglines like "Taking the cheer out of Christmas" and "Mishaps. Misadventures. Mayhem. Oh Joy." The premiere of Lemony Snicket's A Series of Unfortunate Events was held at the Cinerama Dome on December 13, 2004. A  tent display on Vine Street was decorated with pieces from the film's sets.

Home media
Lemony Snicket's A Series of Unfortunate Events was released on DVD and VHS on April 26, 2005. A Portuguese-labeled All-Region Blu-ray was released in 2012 and then an American Region A Blu-ray was released on September 9, 2014. The film was re-released on DVD on January 24, 2017.

Reception

Box office
Lemony Snicket's A Series of Unfortunate Events grossed $118.6 million in the United States and Canada and $92.8 million in other territories for a worldwide total of $211.5 million, against a budget of $140 million.

The film was released in the United States and Canada on December 17, 2004, on 4,400 screens at 3,620 theaters, earning $30.1 million in its opening weekend and finishing first at the box office. In its second weekend the film fell to second behind Meet the Fockers, grossing $12.6 million. It was the highest-grossing film under the Nickelodeon Movies banner until The Last Airbender surpassed it.

Critical response
On Rotten Tomatoes, the film received an approval rating of 72% based on 162 reviews, with an average rating of 6.7/10. The site's critical consensus reads, "Although it softens the nasty edges of its source material, Lemony Snicket's A Series of Unfortunate Events is a gothic visual treat, and it features a hilariously manic turn from Jim Carrey as the evil Count Olaf." On Metacritic, the film has a score of 62 out of 100, based on 37 critics, indicating "generally favorable reviews".

Robert K. Elder of the Chicago Tribune praised Rick Heinrichs's production design and Carrey's balanced performance as a scene stealer, calling the film "exceptionally clever, hilariously gloomy and bitingly subversive." Desson Thomson of The Washington Post reasoned over a fellow film-goer's characterization of Count Olaf, "Olaf is a humorless villain in the book. He's not amusing like Carrey at all. To which I would counter: If you can't let Carrey be Carrey, put someone boring and less expensive in the role. In his various disguises he's rubbery, inventive and improvisationally inspired. I particularly liked his passing imitation of a dinosaur." Ty Burr, in The Boston Globe, observed, "Director Brad Silberling has essentially made a Tim Burton movie without the weird shafts of adolescent pain. At the same time, Silberling's not a hack like Chris Columbus, and Snicket has more zip and inspired filmcraft than the first two Harry Potter films. The film's no masterpiece, but at least you're in the hands of people who know what they're doing. The movie, like the books, flatters children's innate sense that the world is not a perfect place and that anyone who insists otherwise is trying to sell you something. How you deal with the cognitive dissonance of a $125 million Hollywood picture telling you this is up to you. At least there are no Lemony Snicket Happy Meals. Yet." Internet reviewer James Berardinelli felt that "the film is first and foremost a fantasy, but there are dark currents running just beneath the surface. I give Silberling credit for not allowing them to swallow the film. Lemony Snicket's A Series of Unfortunate Events manages to remain witty throughout." Roger Ebert gave a mixed review: "Jim Carrey is over the top as Count Olaf, but I suppose a character named Count Olaf is over the top by definition. I liked the film, but I'll tell you what. I think this one is a tune-up for the series, a trial run in which they figure out what works and what needs to be tweaked. The original Spider-Man was a disappointment, but the same team came back and made Spider-Man 2, the best superhero movie ever made." Scott Foundas of Variety gave a negative review, criticizing the filmmakers for sacrificing the story line in favor of visual elements such as set design and cinematography. He wrote, "A Series of Unfortunate Events suggests what Mary Poppins might have looked like had Tim Burton directed it. Not surprisingly, Burton's longtime production designer Rick Heinrichs was responsible for the sets, while ace Emmanuel Lubezki (Burton's Sleepy Hollow) contributed the expressionistic lighting schemes."

Awards

Possible franchise and reboot

Possible film series
Paramount Pictures, DreamWorks Pictures, and Nickelodeon Movies hoped that the film would become a series like the Harry Potter film series. Carrey thought his character would be good as the basis for a film franchise since it would allow him to dive into a new role, though he said he didn't "have a deal" for a sequel. In May 2005, producer Laurie MacDonald said "Lemony Snicket is still something Paramount is interested in pursuing and we're going to be talking with them more."

In October 2008, Handler said that "a sequel does seem to be in the works. Paramount has had quite a few corporate shakeups, which has led to many a delay. Of course, many, many plans in Hollywood come to naught, but I'm assured that another film will be made. Someday. Perhaps." In June 2009, Silberling confirmed he still talked about the project with Handler, and suggested the sequel be a stop motion film, with each film in a new medium, due to the young lead actors having grown too old to continue their roles, saying, "In an odd way, the best thing you could do is actually have Lemony Snicket say to the audience, 'Okay, we pawned the first film off as a mere dramatization with actors. Now, I'm afraid I'm going to have to show you the real thing.'"

Television series

In November 2014, Netflix announced its plans for a television adaptation of the entire novel series. The series stars Neil Patrick Harris, Malina Weissman, Louis Hynes and Presley Smith, with Patrick Warburton as Lemony Snicket. The series, also titled A Series of Unfortunate Events, premiered on January 13, 2017. The first season consisted of eight episodes, and adapts the first four books of the series. A Series of Unfortunate Events season two was released on March 30, 2018, and contains 10 episodes, adapting books five through nine of the novel series. The third and final season was released on January 1, 2019, and adapts the four remaining books in seven episodes.

Video game

A video game based on the film was released in 2004 by Activision for the PlayStation 2, GameCube, Xbox, Game Boy Advance, and Microsoft Windows. The player plays as all three orphans at points in the game.

References

External links

 
 
 
 
 
 

2004 films
2004 black comedy films
2000s English-language films
American black comedy films
American children's comedy films
American children's fantasy films
American films with live action and animation
Films scored by Thomas Newman
Films about adoption
Films about babies
Films about bibliophilia
Films about orphans
Films about siblings
Films about arson
Films based on American novels
Films based on children's books
Films based on multiple works of a series
Films directed by Brad Silberling
Films shot in California
Films shot in Massachusetts
Films shot in North Carolina
Films that won the Academy Award for Best Makeup
Films with screenplays by Robert Gordon
Nickelodeon Movies films
Paramount Pictures films
A Series of Unfortunate Events
Steampunk films
Films using stop-motion animation
Children's comedy-drama films
Films using motion capture
2004 comedy films
Films produced by Walter F. Parkes
DreamWorks Pictures films
2000s American films